Philibert Vigier (21 January 1636 – 5 January 1719) was a French sculptor.

Biography
Philibert Vigier was born in Moulins in 1636. His brother Étienne Vigier also was a sculptor. The best-known works by Philibert Vigier were made for the gardens of the Palace of Versailles. He became a member of the Académie royale de peinture et de sculpture in 1683. He died in 1719.

Works
His most famous work is the statue of Achilles on Skyros in the Versailles Gardens, which he finished in 1695. Other works in the Gardens include a copy of the Laocoon group, and a gigantic Medici vase. For the castle chapel he created a couple of angels in relief.

He also created a bas-relief medaillon of Saint Thomas for the parish church Notre Dame in Versailles in 1683, one of a series of twelve such sculptures by different sculptors made when they entered the Royal Academy.

Notes

1636 births
1719 deaths
17th-century French sculptors
French male sculptors
Artists from Moulins, Allier